The Ahichchhatra Jain temples is a group of Jain temples in Ahichchhatra village in Aonla tehsil of Bareilly district in Uttar Pradesh, North India. Ahichchhatra is believed to be the place where Parshvanatha, the 23rd Tirthankar of Jainism, attained Kevala Jnana.

Jain tradition 

The history of Ahichchhatra traditionally starts from the period of Rishabhanatha, the first tirthankara. According to Digambara belief, it was visited by all 24 Tirthankaras. Ahichchhatra is believed to be the place where Parshvanatha, the 23rd Tirthankar of Jainism, attained Kevala Gyana (omniscience).  According to Jain texts, it was visited by Parshvanatha during vihara; in an attempt to obstruct Parshvanatha from achieving Kevala Jnana, Kamath, his elder brother, caused continuous rain. Parshvanatha was immersed in water up to his neck but was protected by the serpent God Dharanendra, who held a canopy of a thousand hoods over his head, and the Goddess Padmavati who coiled herself around his body. Following this event, the place was renamed to Ahichchhatra.

History 
Ahichchhatra was one of the sixteen Mahajanapadas. It was considered an important town when Hiuen Tsang visited India in the 7th century CE. Several ancient Jain āyāgapaṭa were excavated from this site, including the famous Nāṃdighoṣa āyāgapaṭa dated early . 27 Jain inscriptions discovered here bear dates prior to 100 CE. 

Alois Anton Führer excavated a Jain temple constructed during the reign of Indo-Scythians dynasty, enhrining idols from 96—152 CE. A number of Jain temples were discovered by Alexander Cunningham during excavation. Many idols, stupas and pillars from the Kushan and Gupta periods have been discovered in Ahichchhatra.

Vividha Tirtha Kalpa, composed by Jinaprabha Suri in the 14th century CE, mentions Samkhyāvatǐ as the earlier name of Ahichchhatra and describes two Jain temples dedicated to Parshvanatha in the area. According to Ahicchatra-nagri-kalpa, this place was visited by Goddess Ambika. Kaivalyamala, written by Jain acharya Udyotansuri in  CE, mentions that Harigupta of the Gupta empire took diksha here.

Temples 

The temples in Ahichchhatra were built to commemorate Parshvanatha attaining Kēvalajñāna kalyāṇaka.

 Digambara Jain temple
The Digambara Jain temple was initially constructed during the reign of King Vasupal. The temple was later reconstructed in 1975. The temple contains 7 vedis, one of which has a  idol of Mahavira while others house idols of Parshvanatha in different postures. The main idol of the temple dates back to the 10th century and is popularly known as Tikhal wale Baba. 

This temple, dedicated to Parshvanatha, is a major Jain pilgrimage center. According to Uttar Pradesh Tourism, over  people visited Ahichchhatra Jain Temple in 2019. 

 Tis Chaubisi temple
The Tis Chaubisi temple was constructed in 2002 CE. The temple houses 720 idols of the 24 Tirthankaras. The mulnayak of this temple is a  idol of Parshvanatha. 

 Bhagwan Parshvanath-Padmavati temple
The Bhagwan Parshvanath-Padmavati temple was constructed in 2007 CE. The temple houses an idol of Parshvanatha in the centre with idols of Dharanendra and Padmavati on either side. 

 Chaubisi temple
The Chaubisi temple is built beside the old Digambara Jain temple in an area spanning . 

 Shwetambar Jain temple
The Shwetambar temple is a beautiful structure known for its unique architecture. The temple is made of buff sandstone and houses a thousand images of the Jain pantheon. 

Both Digambara and Shwetambar Jain temple also have a dharamshala equipped with all modern facilities and bhojnalaya.

Fair 
Ahichchhatra Jain Mela is the primary festival of this temple and is organized annually in March.

Gallery

See also 
 Bijolia Parshvanath temple
 Kampilya
 Sarnath Jain Tirth
 Digamber Jain Bada Mandir Hastinapur

References

Citation

Sources

Book

Web

 
 Uttar Pradesh Tourism

Bibliography

External links

Jain temples in Uttar Pradesh